Stafford is a suburb of Johannesburg, South Africa. It's an industrial suburb located south of the Johannesburg CBD, close to Springfield. It is located in Region F of the City of Johannesburg Metropolitan Municipality.

History
The suburb was established on land called the Booysen Estate. It became a suburb on 7 July 1937 and is named after the landowner, Arentz Edward Stafford.

Sports
Stafford is home to the games of the Basketball National League, South Africa's top basketball division. The games take place at the Wembley Stadium, a former ice-rink which holds up to 3,000 visitors.

References

Johannesburg Region F